Felix Nussbaum (11 December 1904 – 9 August 1944) was a German-Jewish surrealist painter. Nussbaum's work gives insights into the essence of one person among the victims of the Holocaust.

Early life and education 
Nussbaum was born in Osnabrück, Germany, to parents Rahel and Philipp Nussbaum. His father was a World War I veteran and German patriot before the rise of the Nazis. He was an amateur painter when he was younger, but was forced to pursue other means of work for financial reasons. Because of this, he is said to have encouraged his son to pursue art as a profession.

Nussbaum was a lifelong student, beginning his formal studies in 1920 in Hamburg and Berlin, and continuing as long as the contemporary political situation allowed him. In his earlier works, Nussbaum was heavily influenced by Vincent van Gogh and Henri Rousseau, and he eventually paid homage to Giorgio de Chirico and Carlo Carrà as well. Karl Hofer’s expressionist painting is said to have influenced Nussbaum's careful approach to color.

In 1933, Nussbaum was studying under a scholarship in Rome at the Berlin Academy of the Arts when the Nazis seized control of Germany. When Adolf Hitler sent his Minister of Propaganda to Rome in April to explain to the artist elites how a Nazi artist should promote heroism and the Aryan race, Nussbaum realized that, as a Jew, he could not remain at the academy.

Deportation to death camps 

The next decade of Nussbaum's life was characterized by fear, which is reflected in his artwork. In 1934, he took Felka Platek, a painter whom he had met while studying in Berlin and would later marry during their exile in Brussels in 1937, to meet his parents in Switzerland. Felix's parents eventually grew homesick for Germany and, against his fierce objections, they returned. This was the last time Felix would see his mother and father — the source of his spiritual and financial support. Felix and Felka would spend the next ten years in exile, mostly in Belgium, a period of emotional and artistic isolation for him but also one of the most artistically productive times in his life.

After Nazi Germany attacked Belgium in 1940, Nussbaum was arrested by Belgian police as a "hostile alien" German, and was subsequently taken to the Saint-Cyprien camp in France. The desperate circumstances in the camp influenced his pictures of that time. He eventually signed a request to the French camp authorities to be returned to Germany. On the train ride from Saint-Cyprien to Germany, he managed to escape and settled with Felka in occupied Belgium, and they began a life in hiding. Without residency papers, Nussbaum had no way of earning an income, but friends provided him with shelter and art supplies so that he could continue his craft. In 1943 he painted the Self Portrait with a Jewish identity card. In the painting there is a tree (Nussbaum translates into Nuttree in English) whose branches are cut, with one branch bearing blossoms.

In 1944, the Nussbaum family was greatly impacted by the plans of Nazi Germany; Philipp and Rahel Nussbaum were killed at Auschwitz in February, and in July Nussbaum and his wife were found hiding in an attic by German armed forces. They were arrested, sent to the Mechelen transit camp and given the numbers XXVI/284 and XXVI/285. On 2 August, they arrived at Auschwitz, and a week later, Felix was murdered at the age of 39. On 3 September, Nussbaum's brother was sent to Auschwitz, and on 6 September his sister-in-law and niece were also murdered there. In December, his brother – the last of the family – died from exhaustion in the camp at Stutthof. Within one year, the entire Nussbaum family had been murdered.

Major works
In this time period, Nussbaum created two of his best-known works: Self Portrait with Jewish Identity Card (1943), and Triumph of Death (1944).

Triumph of Death 
Triumph of Death shows Nussbaum's attention to detail. According to his biography, Felix Nussbaum: Art Defamed; Art in Exile; Art in Resistance, the crumpled music score has the first several bars of "The Lambeth Walk", a popular song from the musical Me and My Girl. The words that would normally accompany the music are "Ev'rythin' free and easy / Do as you darn well please".

Selected paintings

Legacy 

Felix Nussbaum's artwork reflects and interprets his experiences as a victim of the Holocaust. In 1998, the Felix Nussbaum Haus in Osnabrück opened to permanently exhibit his works.

He was featured alongside fellow concentration camp survivors and artists Jan Komski and Dinah Gottliebova in the 1999 documentary film Eyewitness, which was nominated for an Academy Award for Documentary Short Subject.

Art and Remembrance: The Legacy of Felix Nussbaum is a 1993 documentary directed by Barbara Pfeffer.

References 
Citations

Bibliography
"Friedensstadt Osnabrück - Felix Nussbaum" 
Karl, Kaster G. Felix Nussbaum: Art Defamed, Art in Exile, Art in Resistance. 1st English ed. Overlook, 1997.
"Ten Dreams: Felix Nussbaum Galleries"

External links 

 Felix Nussbaum - online exhibition from Yad Vashem
 Werkverzeichnis
 Ten Dreams Galleries
 The Felix Nussbaum Haus (Museum)

1904 births
1944 deaths
Artists from Osnabrück
20th-century German painters
20th-century German male artists
German male painters
German surrealist artists
Jewish painters
German people who died in Auschwitz concentration camp
German civilians killed in World War II
The Holocaust in Belgium
German Jews who died in the Holocaust